The Family Rico is a 1972 American TV movie directed by Paul Wendkos based on a novel by Georges Simenon. A Mafia chief is torn between his brother, who has defected from the family, and his loyalty to the organization. It was a remake of The Brothers Rico.

Cast
Ben Gazzara
Jo Van Fleet
Leif Erickson
Sal Mineo
John Marley
James Farentino
Sian Barbara Allen
John Randolph

Reception
The New York Times called it "serviceable".

References

External links

The Family Rico at BFI

1972 television films
1972 films
Films based on Belgian novels
Films based on works by Georges Simenon
Television shows based on works by Georges Simenon
American television films
Films directed by Paul Wendkos